Viale is a town in the west of the province of Entre Ríos, Argentina. It is located about 50 km east from the provincial capital Paraná.

References
 
 Viale Digital.

Populated places in Entre Ríos Province